Speakeasy Dollhouse is a series of immersive plays based on Cynthia von Buhler's investigations of mysterious deaths in site-specific, historic locations. Original funding for the project was obtained via Kickstarter in 2011. The plays are currently produced by Russell Farhang and Cynthia von Buhler's production company, Smoosh & Smoosh Inc. The Bloody Beginning opened in New York City in 2011. The Brothers Booth ran in 2014. Ziegfeld's Midnight Frolic opened in Spring 2015.

Play One: Speakeasy Dollhouse: The Bloody Beginning
Episode One, The Bloody Beginning, is based on von Buhler's investigation of the mysterious 1935 murder of her grandfather. The play was written and directed by von Buhler.

Synopsis
The play presents a series of vignettes that occur over the years 1925 to 1935 and were considered the playwright to be pivotal in the understanding of the climactic moment of Frank Spano's murder. The story extends beyond his death to encompass the hasty trial of Spano's confessed killer but leaves to the audience the final conclusions about why and by whom the murders were committed.

Immersive location
Speakeasy Dollhouse is staged in Meyer Lansky's former Lower East Side hangout. Unlike plays presented in a traditional proscenium, the site-specific set design invites the audience to walk freely throughout various rooms of the venue. Designed to mimic the dollhouse-scale sets depicted in the graphic novel, there is a speakeasy bar, private alleyway, club cum living room, bakery, coroner's office and Pre-war bedroom. The audience is encouraged to dress in Roaring Twenties period attire. Upon arrival, each person receives a slip of paper assigning them a unique character to play and instructions to "ignore the advice your parents gave you as children, be nosy and talk to strangers." When not performing predefined scenes, the actors circulate throughout the space, ad libbing in character with everyone in attendance.

Dollhouse sets
In 1936, as a means to better explore these cases and train investigators of sudden or violent deaths to assess visual evidence, Frances Glessner Lee created the Nutshell Studies of Unexplained Death. These studies consisted of detailed, 1:12 scale dollhouse models that students could examine from every angle. Taking inspiration from the Nutshell Studies, von Buhler recreated the scenes from her grandfather's murder and the events leading up to it using her own handmade sets and dolls. Utilizing evidence gathered from autopsy reports, police records, court documents, and interviews in tandem with the dolls and sets, she has pieced together a variety of probable scenarios to explain the crime.

Future publications
The play is also being used as research for a graphic novel von Buhler is writing. The limited-edition book funded by Kickstarter was an introduction to the story and explains how she first heard about her grandfather's mysterious death as young girl.  In a New York Times interview, von Buhler stated that the follow-up book would be a new genre, "Pulp Non-Fiction".

Characters
Frank Spano (Russell Farhang, Pasha Pelosie, E. James Ford): Italian-American immigrant who ran an ice delivery service and two Prohibition Era speakeasies in the Bronx.
Mary Spano (Dana MacDonald): Italian American immigrant and extremely pious wife of Frank Spano. Born "Maria Sforza" in Bari, Italy.
Dominick Spano (Rachel Boyadjis): The oldest son of Frank and Mary Spano.
Cousin Frankie Spano (E. James Ford): Employee of Spano Ice.
Anna Spano (Esther Westwood): Cousin Frankie's Jewish wife.
John Guerrieri (Silent James): Italian American immigrant who is a neighbor to Frank and Mary Spano and works as a barber. He is charged with Frank Spano's murder.
Lucrezia Guerrieri (Katelan V. Foisy): Wife of John Guerrieri and mother of four, implied to be having an affair with Frank Spano.
Dutch Schultz (Travis Moore, Josh Weinstein): Born Arthur Flegenheimer, Schultz is a notorious Jewish mobster whose speakeasies are a competitor to Frank Spano's.
Frances Flegenheimer (Maria Rusolo): Dutch Schultz's wife.
Lulu Rosenkrantz (Travis Moore): Dutch Shultz's bodyguard
Detective Thomas Crane (Justin Moore): Manhattan 17th Precinct detective assigned to handle the murder case.
Dr. Thomas A Gonzalez (Jeffrey Wengrofsky, Chris Fink, Paul Duncan,): Chief Medical Examiner in New York City at the time of Frank's murder.
Nurse Bessie Stitch (Heather Bunch, Sarah Moskowitz): Chief Medical Examiner's assistant. Former Gibson Girl.
Jimmy Hines (Charley Layton): Leader of Democratic Party political machine Tammany Hall.
Magistrate Hulon Capshaw (Scott Southard): New York City judge in charge of the grand jury trial after Frank Spano's murder, eventually dismissing the case without explanation. He is eventually tried on corruption charges and disbarred.
Dominick Grimaldi (Uncle Nino): Frank Spano's undertaker.
Lena Doino (Kat Mon Dieu): Lucrezia Guerrieri's friend and neighbor. Lena's husband Anthony Doino worked for Knickerbocker Ice Company, competitor of Spano Ice.
Bakery Shop Girl: Kate Black
Bakery Assistant: Ariel Wolf
Speakeasy Hostess and Host: Ali Luminescent, Jennifer Harder
Fortune Teller: Jordana Rollerhoops
Millie Nelba: Rachel LeWinter, Katie Kat
15-year-old Cynthia von Buhler: PJ Mead
Burlesque Performers: Vary by performance. Past performers have included Veronica Varlow, Lillet St. Sunday, Kat Mon Dieu, Delysia LaChatte, and Porcelain Dalya.
House Band:  Henry Azelrod & The Gut Buckets as played by Howard Fishman and his band.

Special guests
Alison Wright, a starring actor in the 2013 TV series, The Americans, played Lena Doino at one show in 2014. The undertaker, Dominick Grimaldi, was played by Edgar Oliver from 2011 to 2013, a New York City playwright and poet who frequently appears on the television show Oddities. Dominick Grimaldi was played by Uncle Nino, a New York City celebrity who frequently appeared on Jersey Shore, a reality TV Series. For the June 2012 production, Neil Gaiman appeared as Assistant Coroner and performed a duet of "Makin' Whoopee" with Amanda Palmer.

Television
Von Buhler, the coroner's office diorama, and the play's secret location were central to an episode of The Discovery Channel's reality television show Oddities.
The episode titled A Gurney for Grandpa focuses on the television show's stars Mike Zohn and Evan Michelson as they locate an antique gurney for the play to match the miniature one von Buhler
used in her crime scene diorama.

Film
Of Dolls and Murder, directed by Susan Marks and narrated by John Waters, is a documentary about Frances Glessner Lee's crime scene investigation dollhouse dioramas. Marks is currently working on an Of Dolls and Murder sequel about Speakeasy Dollhouse.

Music
On June 4, 2012, Neil Gaiman and Amanda Palmer sang a rendition of Makin' Whoopee during a performance.

Songs by Amanda Palmer, Kim Boekbinder, and the Howard Fishman Quartet were featured with permission in the Speakeasy Dollhouse project launch video used during the Kickstarter campaign.

Play Two: Speakeasy Dollhouse: The Brothers Booth
The Brothers Booth is based on von Buhler's investigation of the murder of Abraham Lincoln by John Wilkes Booth. Von Buhler sets out to prove that the murder occurred due to sibling rivalry between the brothers, Edwin Booth and John Wilkes Booth. The story was written by Cynthia von Buhler with additional scenes by Mat Smart. The play was directed by Wes Grantom. The play is held in Edwin Booth's former home and club, The Players (New York City).

Synopsis
At Edwin Booth's Gramercy Park statue unveiling a tattooed man brings an uninvited guest, the John Wilkes Booth mummy. Angry ghosts appear. Did John Wilkes Booth shoot Abraham Lincoln because of the outcome of the Civil War, or was the killer tortured by an intense sibling rivalry? Brothers Edwin and John Wilkes Booth both wanted to wear their famous father Junius Brutus Booth's thespian mantle. John Wilkes, the favorite son, was kept in school by his parents in the hopes that he'd chose a worthier professional than acting. Meanwhile, Edwin's childhood was spent being valet to his crazed, alcoholic genius of a father. This situation trained Edwin to become a talented, hard-working star who deeply understood the nuances of Shakespeare, while the younger brother grew into an impatient, fame-seeking dreamer.

Immersive location
The Brothers Booth is staged in Edwin Booth's former Gramercy Park mansion, The Players (New York City). Unlike plays presented in a traditional[proscenium, the site-specific set design invites the audience to walk freely throughout various rooms of the venue. There is a speakeasy room, private alleyway, parlor, billiard room, seance room, stairway, bar, library, Mark Twain's gambling room, The John Singer Sargent room, VIP room, and Edwin Booth's bedroom. The audience is encouraged to dress in Roaring Twenties period attire. Upon arrival, each person receives a slip of paper assigning them a unique character to play.

Characters
Edwin Booth (Eric Gravez): The ghost of the celebrated Shakespearean actor and brother of John Wilkes Booth.
John Wilkes Booth: (Ryan Wesen): The ghost of the murderer of Abraham Lincoln and brother of Edwin Booth.
Junius Brutus Booth: The ghost of the celebrated Shakespearean actor and father of Edwin Booth and John Wilkes Booth.
John Drew Jr. (Russell Farhang): The celebrated Shakespearean actor and president of The Players Club in 1919.
Guy Nichols (Chris Fink): The Players Club librarian in 1919 and a former Shakespearean actor.
John Singer Sargent (E. James Ford): A celebrated painter.
Henry Jones (Dan Olsen): A tattooed man from the circus.
Mark Twain (Scott Southard): The ghost of the celebrated author and one of the founders of The Players Club.
William Hope: A spiritualist and photographer. (Paul Duncan).
Edwina Booth Grossman: The daughter of Edwin Booth.
Opal Jones (Chrissy Bansham): A spiritualist and circus performer.
Annabelle Rose(Hannah Rose): A Southern taxi dancer.
Fanny Williams: A taxi dancer.
Jenny St. James: A taxi dancer.
Annie Jameston: An Irish taxi dancer.
Lorna Larue: A taxi dancer.
Clara Thomas: A taxi dancer.
Violet Jones (Katelan Foisy): A tarot reader.
Young Edwin Booth(Jonas Barranca): The young ghost of the celebrated Shakespearean actor and brother of John Wilkes Booth.
Young John Wilkes Booth(Skyler Gallun): The young ghost of the murderer of Abraham Lincoln and brother of Edwin Booth.
Tansy Tandori: The speakeasy hostess and burlesque dancer.
Silent James: A silent performer and artist.
Puppeteers (Erin Orr, Stacee Mandeville)
Grandpa Musseleman and His Syncopators: The speakeasy band.

Play Three: Speakeasy Dollhouse: Ziegfeld's Midnight Frolic
Ziegfeld's Midnight Frolic is based on von Buhler's investigation of the poisoning death of Olive Thomas, wife of Jack Pickford. Was her death an accident, a murder, or a suicide? The story was written and directed by Cynthia von Buhler. The associate director is Chris Fink and the Directorial Consultant is Alison Wright, a starring actor in The Americans. Dance is choreographed by Delysia La Chatte. The play is held in The Liberty Theater.

Synopsis
The Glorifier of the American Girl, Florenz Ziegfeld, invites you to join his Follies for an evening of music, magic, mystery, mayhem, and spirits. Audience members pursue their interests across an expansive environment exploring the wonders and the dangers of the Golden Age of Broadway. The immersive play reimagines his 1920's extravaganza, The Midnight Frolic, with showgirls, burlesque, aerialists, song and dance. Audience members choose their corruption at Montmartre's Cabaret du Néant while a garish garcon apprises them with tales of guillotines and deadly bacteria. The audience sleuths the luxury suite at Hotel Ritz Paris where Jack Pickford allegedly tried to save his wife, Follies’ star Olive Thomas, after she drank poison.

Olive Thomas's ghost
Olive Thomas's ghost is said to haunt The New Amsterdam Theater which is located next door to The Liberty Theater. According to theater personnel, her ghost appears and walks through the 41st street wall. The Liberty Theater is on the other side of the wall.

Immersive location
Ziegfeld's Midnight Frolic is staged in The Liberty Theater in Times Square. Unlike plays presented in a traditional proscenium, the site-specific set design invites the audience to walk freely throughout various rooms of the venue. There is a follies theater, Montmartre alleyway, The Cabaret of Nothingness, The Ritz Hotel in Paris, Ziegfeld's office, and Alberto Vargas' art reception. The audience is encouraged to dress in Roaring Twenties period attire. Upon arrival, each person receives a slip of paper assigning them a unique character to play.

Bibliography

References

External links
Graphic novel Speakeasy Dollhouse, The Bloody Beginning
Play Speakeasy Dollhouse
Cynthia von Buhler's website

Site-specific theatre
Prohibition in the United States
Kickstarter projects
American graphic novels
2011 plays
American plays
Plays set in the 1920s
Plays set in the 1930s
Plays based on actual events